This is a list of seasons completed by the Anaheim Piranhas. The Anaheim Piranhas were a professional arena football franchise of the Arena Football League (AFL), based in Anaheim, California. The team was established in 1994 as the Las Vegas Sting. The Sting made the playoffs in their first season, but lost their quarterfinal playoff game. The franchise relocated to Anaheim for the 1996 season, and changed their name to the Piranhas. The Piranhas also made the playoffs in their first season, but lost their quarterfinal game to the eventual champion Tampa Bay Storm. After the 1997 season, the team folded. They played their home games at Arrowhead Pond.

References
General
 
 

Arena Football League seasons by team
Anaheim Piranhas
California sports-related lists
Nevada sports-related lists